The Ilfovăț is a left tributary of the river Neajlov in Romania. It discharges into the Neajlov in Iepurești.

References

Rivers of Romania
Rivers of Giurgiu County